Stéphane Lessard (born 2 February 1962) is a French ice hockey player. He competed in the men's tournament at the 1988 Winter Olympics.

References

1962 births
Living people
Olympic ice hockey players of France
Ice hockey players at the 1988 Winter Olympics
Ice hockey people from Quebec
Quebec Remparts players
Trois-Rivières Draveurs players
Flint Generals players
Chamonix HC players
Place of birth missing (living people)